Blythswood may refer to:

People
 Baron Blythswood
 Archibald Campbell, 1st Baron Blythswood
 Barrington Campbell, 3rd Baron Blythswood
 Archibald Douglas, 4th Baron Blythswood

Places
 Blythswood Hill, area of Glasgow, Scotland
 Blythswood Square, square in the Blythswood Hill area
 Blythswood House, former neoclassical mansion in Renfrew, Scotland (demolished 1935)
 Blythswood, Eastern Cape

Other
 Blythswood F.C., a 19th-century football club based in Glasgow